Boleścin may refer to the following places in Poland:
Boleścin in Gmina Świdnica, Świdnica County in Lower Silesian Voivodeship (SW Poland)
Boleścin in Gmina Trzebnica, Trzebnica County in Lower Silesian Voivodeship (SW Poland)